Heritage Party may refer to:

 Christian Liberty Party (formerly American Heritage Party), a political party in the United States
Jathika Hela Urumaya (National Heritage Party), a political party in Sri Lanka
Heritage (Armenia), a political party in Armenia
 Heritage Party (UK), a UK political party led by former London Assembly member David Kurten
 Heritage Party (Zambia), a political party in Zambia
 Heritage Party (Malaysia), a political party in Malaysia